The Chuckwalla River is a river in the Central Coast region of British Columbia, Canada, flowing into Kilbella Bay, which is a sidewater of Rivers Inlet.

The Kilbella River also flows into Kilbella Bay.

See also
Chuckwalla (disambiguation)

References

Rivers of the Central Coast of British Columbia